Æthelstan was king of East Anglia in the 9th century. As with the other kings of East Anglia, there is very little textual information available. Æthelstan did, however, leave an extensive coinage of both portrait and non-portrait type. 

It is suggested that Æthelstan was probably the king who defeated and killed the Mercian kings Beornwulf (d. 826) and Ludeca (d. 827). He may have attempted to seize power in East Anglia on the death of Coenwulf of Mercia (d. 821). If this is the case, he was apparently defeated by Coenwulf's successor Ceolwulf.

The end of Æthelstan's reign is placed in the middle or late 840s. He was succeeded by Æthelweard.

References 
 Kirby, D.P., The Earliest English Kings. London: Unwin Hyman, 1991. 
 Yorke, Barbara, Kings and Kingdoms of Early Anglo-Saxon England. London: Seaby, 1990.

External links
 

Anglo-Saxon warriors
East Anglian monarchs
9th-century English monarchs